The 2019 Internazionali di Tennis Città di Vicenza was a professional tennis tournament played on clay courts. It was the sixth edition of the tournament which was part of the 2019 ATP Challenger Tour. It took place in Vicenza, Italy between 27 May and 2 June 2019.

Singles main-draw entrants

Seeds

 1 Rankings are as of 20 May 2019.

Other entrants
The following players received wildcards into the singles main draw:
  Francesco Forti
  Luca Giacomini
  Lorenzo Musetti
  Julian Ocleppo
  Giulio Zeppieri

The following players received entry into the singles main draw using their ITF World Tennis Ranking:
  Javier Barranco Cosano
  Riccardo Bonadio
  Raúl Brancaccio
  Skander Mansouri
  Oriol Roca Batalla

The following player received entry into the singles main draw as an alternate:
  Marco Bortolotti

The following players received entry from the qualifying draw:
  Benjamin Hassan
  Andrea Vavassori

The following player received entry as a lucky loser:
  Andrea Pellegrino

Champions

Singles

 Alessandro Giannessi def.  Filippo Baldi 7–5, 6–2.

Doubles

 Gonçalo Oliveira /  Andrei Vasilevski def.  Fabrício Neis /  Fernando Romboli 6–3, 6–4.

References

Internazionali di Tennis Città di Vicenza
2019
Internazionali di Tennis Città di Vicenza